Cyperus atkinsonii is a species of sedge that is native to parts of western Asia.

The species was first formally described by the botanist Charles Baron Clarke in 1884.

See also
 List of Cyperus species

References

atkinsonii
Taxa named by Charles Baron Clarke
Plants described in 1884
Flora of Iran
Flora of Pakistan
Flora of India (region)